Groningen is an unincorporated community in Dell Grove Township, Pine County, Minnesota, United States.

The community is located immediately northwest of Sandstone; near the intersection of Pine County 35, Pine County 28 (Groningen Road), and the former Northern Pacific Railway (now the Willard Munger State Trail).

History
Located in the northeast corner of Dell Grove Township, Groningen is named after a northeast province of the Netherlands.  The community was originally known as Miller Station.  When it had a post office, it was known as Belknap from 1877 to 1881, and then Groningen, from 1896 to 1913, and again from 1917 to 1954.

References

 Official State of Minnesota Highway Map – 2011/2012 edition

Unincorporated communities in Minnesota
Unincorporated communities in Pine County, Minnesota